was a Japanese Confucian scholar, poet, and painter from Hizen (Saga domain, now part of Saga and Nagasaki prefectures).

References

Japanese Confucianists
1787 births
1867 deaths
Japanese poets